The Worldwide Attack Matrix is a document describing covert counter-terrorism operations in 80 countries in Asia, the Middle East and Africa created in the wake of the September 11, 2001, terrorist attacks. It was presented by Director of Central Intelligence George J. Tenet in a briefing held at Camp David on September 15, 2001. Reporter Bob Woodward of The Washington Post was the first to publicly mention the document  in a series of articles published in January 2002. At the time of publication, the described operations were already ongoing or being proposed.

The actions, underway or being recommended, ranged from "routine propaganda to lethal covert action in preparation for military attacks".

See also
 State of War: The Secret History of the CIA and the Bush Administration

External links
 At Camp David, Advise and Dissent The Post article, by Bob Woodward and Dan Balz

Government documents of the United States
Central Intelligence Agency